Thomas Aguiyi-Ironsi (born  1953) is a Nigerian politician and diplomat who previously served as minister of state for Defence. He is the son of former military leader Major General Johnson Aguiyi-Ironsi, and was the ambassador to Togo before former President Olusegun Obasanjo appointed him to succeed Roland Oritsejafor as Minister of state for Defence.

While Aguiyi-Ironsi was ambassador to Togo, the choices to replace the outgoing Foreign Minister, Ngozi Okonjo-Iweala, were reportedly narrowed down to him and Joy Ogwu. However, after Obasanjo fired Oritsejafor, Aguiyi-Ironsi received the job of Defence Minister while Ogwu became foreign minister. The two were sworn in on 30 August 2006.

On 24 January 2007, Aguiyi-Ironsi announced that Nigeria would send a battalion of peacekeeping troops to Somalia.

References

External links
April elections, a big challenge - Military, Nigerian Tribune

Defence ministers of Nigeria
Ambassadors of Nigeria to Togo
Living people
Year of birth missing (living people)
Igbo people
Nigerian politicians
Nigerian diplomats